Jiří Skála (born 10 October 1973) is a Czech football midfielder. He made over 200 appearances in the Gambrinus liga. Skála played international football at under-21 level for Czech Republic U21. He scored for Slavia Prague in the 1998–99 UEFA Cup in the 4–0 second qualifying round victory against FK Inter Bratislava.

Honours

Club

 Slavia Prague
 Czech Cup: 1998–99

References

External links

1973 births
Living people
Czech footballers
Czech Republic under-21 international footballers
Czech First League players
FC Viktoria Plzeň players
SK Slavia Prague players
FK Teplice players
FK Mladá Boleslav players
SK Dynamo České Budějovice players
Association football midfielders
Czech National Football League managers
FK Ústí nad Labem managers